Washington Jefferson Park is a 21-acre urban public park in Eugene, Oregon, United States.

See also
 Big Red (sculpture)

References

Parks in Eugene, Oregon